This is a list of cities in Asia by country.

List of cities in Afghanistan
List of cities in Armenia
List of cities in Azerbaijan
List of cities in Bahrain
List of cities and towns in Bangladesh
List of cities in Bhutan
List of cities and towns in Brunei
List of cities in Cambodia
List of cities in China
List of cities in Cyprus
List of cities, towns and villages in East Timor
List of cities in Georgia (country)
List of cities in Hong Kong
List of cities in India
List of cities in Indonesia
List of cities in Iran
List of cities in Iraq
List of cities in Israel
List of cities in Japan
List of cities in Jordan
List of cities in Kazakhstan
List of cities in North Korea
List of cities in South Korea
Districts of Kuwait
List of cities in Kyrgyzstan
List of cities in Laos
List of cities and towns in Lebanon
List of cities in Macau
List of cities in Malaysia
List of cities, towns and villages in the Maldives
List of cities in Mongolia
List of cities and largest towns in Myanmar
List of cities in Nepal
List of cities in Oman
List of cities in Pakistan
List of cities administered by the Palestinian Authority
List of cities in the Philippines
List of cities in Qatar
List of cities in Russia
List of cities and towns in Saudi Arabia
List of places in Singapore
List of cities in Sri Lanka
List of cities in Syria
List of cities in Taiwan
List of cities in Tajikistan
List of cities in Thailand
List of cities in Turkey
List of cities in Turkmenistan
List of cities in the United Arab Emirates
List of cities in Uzbekistan
List of cities in Vietnam
List of cities in Yemen

See also
Asia
List of metropolitan areas in Asia
List of urban agglomerations in Asia
Lists of cities
Lists of cities by country
 List of cities by continent
 List of cities in Africa
 List of cities in North America
 List of cities in South America
 List of cities in Europe
 List of cities in Oceania
 
 

Asia